Wasa 30 is a Swedish sailboat from Wasa Yachts AB, that was introduced in 1979. It measures LOA 11.00m, beam 2.20 m, draft 1.80 m, displacement 2 400 kg and sailarea 30.0 m².

Hull
In length, height and width the above-waterline design resembles the classical Skerry Cruiser design. The '30' in the model name also refers to the Skerry Cruiser sail area rules. Although the hull is quite different from the Skerry Cruisers below the water line, which is quite flat with a deep fin keel.

Rig
The Wasa 30 is fractional rigged. There are two versions, high rig (HR) and low rig (LR), differing in sailarea and thus sailing performance.

External links
Official description and pictures of Wasa 30 at the Wasa Yachts website
Official website of Wasa Yachts
Private website with images and facts about Wasa 30 

Sailing yachts
1970s sailboat type designs
Sailboat type designs by Swedish designers